Turkey Creek is a stream in the U.S. state of Georgia. It is a tributary to Indian Creek.

Turkey Creek was so named for the wild turkeys near its course. A variant name is "Big Turkey Creek".

References

Rivers of Georgia (U.S. state)
Rivers of Carroll County, Georgia
Rivers of Haralson County, Georgia